Yadamvaripalli is a village which is located in Chinnagottigallu of Tirupati district, Andhra Pradesh.
There is a famous Shri Draupathi Devi temple and every year Mahabaratham is being conducted in the temple premises

Villages in Tirupati district